The Kurukkalmadam massacre was a massacre of Sri Lankan Muslims in Kurukkalmadam by the Liberation Tigers of Tamil Eelam (LTTE). The number of casualties is estimated to be 60-168.

Background
Following the breakdown of the June 1990 peace talks, Tamil-Muslim relations in the Eastern Province deteriorated rapidly. Many Muslims in the East took a pro-army stance in the war. Some acted as informants for the army, identifying LTTE hideouts and LTTE supporters. A cycle of tit-for-tat violence between the LTTE and Muslim Home Guards emerged, leading to the massacres of civilians on both sides.

Incident
Muslim travellers from Kattankudy and Colombo in vehicles, including Hajj pilgrims, were stopped by the LTTE near Kurukkalmadam. Some Muslims were removed from the vehicles but others were allowed to return, allegedly so that they could inform other Muslims about what was happening at Kurukkalmadam. The LTTE's method of selecting which Muslims would be taken away was described as picking "at random- like eeny, meeny, miny, moe- you shall live and you shall die." 35 Muslim bus passengers were shot dead by the LTTE. The LTTE, at first, seemed to only be interested in holding the rest for ransom. However, at some point, the LTTE decided to kill them. The Muslim captives, including seniors and children, were hacked to death and their corpses were burnt. 

Various explanations for the decision to massacre exist. One theory is that the LTTE was appealing to the anti-Muslim sentiment among Tamil refugees in the east who saw the Muslims as complicit in government atrocities against Tamils. Tamil villagers in Kurukkalmadam suspected that the LTTE's motive for the massacre was to draw negative army attention towards the villagers. Muslim residents of Kalmunai, on the other hand, saw the massacre as a way to warn Muslims against identifying LTTE hideouts for the Sri Lankan Army.

In response to the massacre, Muslim leaders sought the intervention of the Roman Catholic Church.

Mass grave
Families of the deceased alleged that the bodies of the massacred are in a mass grave at Kaluwanchikudy. In 2014, 66 relatives of the victims requested that the skeletons be exhumed from the mass grave to allow them to give the deceased proper burials. The Kaluwanchikudy court ordered an exhumation and asked the office of the Chief Judicial Medical Officer (Colombo) to carry it out. The Justice Ministry was contacted by the office for funding for experts for a length of time but never responded.

References

Massacres in 1990
Massacres in Sri Lanka
1990 in Sri Lanka
Attacks on civilians attributed to the Liberation Tigers of Tamil Eelam